On My Way is a studio album by B. J. Thomas via Scepter Records. Released in 1968, the album contained two singles: "The Eyes of a New York Woman" (which reached No. 28 in the U.S. and No. 29 in Canada) and "Hooked on a Feeling" (which peaked at No. 5 in the U.S. and No. 3 in Canada). Also included on the album are covers of "Four Walls" (originally by Jim Reeves), "Light My Fire" (originally by the Doors) and "Mr. Businessman" (originally by Ray Stevens).

Track listing
 "The Eyes of a New York Woman" (Mark James) - 3:03
 "Mr. Businessman" (Fred Foster, Ray Stevens) - 3:21
 "Light My Fire" (Robby Krieger) - 3:01
 "Gone" (Smokey Rogers) - 3:50
 "Hooked on a Feeling" (Mark James) - 2:48
 "Smoke Gets in Your Eyes" (Otto Harbach, Jerome Kern) - 3:03
 "Four Walls" (Marvin Moore, George Campbell) - 2:52
 "Sandman" (Wayne Carson) - 3:16
 "I've Been Down This Road Before" (Mark James, Spooner Oldham) - 2:51
 "I Saw Pity in the Face of a Friend" (Nickolas Ashford, Valerie Simpson) - 2:25

Chart performance

References

1968 albums
B. J. Thomas albums
Albums produced by Chips Moman
Scepter Records albums